William Watkins ( –  January 1972) was a Welsh rugby union, and professional rugby league footballer who played in the 1930s and 1940s.

Playing career

Salford
Watkins played in the 10–8 victory over Swinton in the 1931 Lancashire Cup Final during the 1931–32 season at The Cliff, Broughton, Salford on Saturday 21 November 1931.

Watkins played  in Salford's 3–15 defeat by Wigan in the Championship Final during the 1933–34 season at Wilderspool Stadium, Warrington on Saturday 28 April 1934.

Watkins was one of the players who successfully toured in France with Salford in 1934, during which the Salford team earned the name "Les Diables Rouges", the seventeen players were; Joe Bradbury, Bob Brown, Aubrey Casewell, Paddy Dalton, Bert Day, Cliff Evans, Jack Feetham, George Harris, Barney Hudson, Emlyn Jenkins, Alf Middleton, Sammy Miller, Harold Osbaldestin, Les Pearson, Gus Risman, Billy Watkins and Billy Williams.

He played in the 21–12 victory over Wigan in the 1934 Lancashire Cup Final during the 1934–35 season at Station Road, Swinton on Saturday 20 October 1934, the 15–7 victory over Wigan in the 1935 Lancashire Cup Final during the 1935–36 season at Wilderspool Stadium, Warrington on Saturday 19 October 1935 and the 5–2 victory over Wigan in the 1936 Lancashire Cup Final during the 1936–37 season at Wilderspool Stadium, Warrington.

Watkins played  in Salford's 7–4 victory over Barrow in the 1938 Challenge Cup Final during the 1937–38 season at Wembley Stadium, London, in front of a crowd of 51,243.

Watkins played  in the 7–10 defeat by Wigan in the 1938 Lancashire Cup Final during the 1938–39 season at Station Road, Swinton on Saturday 22 October 1938.

Belle Vue Rangers
Watkins signed for Belle Vue Rangers in August 1946.

International honours
Watkins won caps for Wales (RL) while at Salford in 1932–1936 6-caps, and won caps for Great Britain (RL) while at Salford in 1933 against Australia, in 1936 against Australia (2 matches), New Zealand (2 matches), and in 1937 against Australia (2 matches).

Family
Billy Watkins was the father of; Huw Watkins, Gareth Watkins and Haydn Watkins, and the grandfather of the cricketer, Ryan Watkins.

References

External links
!Great Britain Statistics at englandrl.co.uk (statistics currently missing due to not having appeared for both Great Britain, and England)

1910s births
1972 deaths
Welsh rugby league players
Welsh rugby union players
Cross Keys RFC players
Footballers who switched code
Rugby league halfbacks
Great Britain national rugby league team players
Salford Red Devils players
Oldham R.L.F.C. players
Broughton Rangers players
Wales national rugby league team players
Year of birth uncertain